John George Lathan (born 12 April 1952) is an English former professional footballer who played as a midfielder for Sunderland.

He was part of the Mansfield Town team that won the Fourth Division in the 1974–75 season.

References

1952 births
Living people
Footballers from Sunderland
English footballers
Association football midfielders
Sunderland A.F.C. players
Mansfield Town F.C. players
Carlisle United F.C. players
Barnsley F.C. players
Portsmouth F.C. players
Consett A.F.C. players
Wollongong Wolves FC players
Arcadia Shepherds F.C. players
Mamelodi Sundowns F.C. players
English Football League players